Possessed by Fire is the first studio album by the German thrash metal band Exumer. It was released on 8 November 1986 through Disaster Records. The album was produced by Harris Johns at Music Lab Berlin.

Track listing

Personnel 
 Mem V. Stein – vocals, bass
 Ray Mensh – guitar
 Bernie Siedler – guitar, backing vocals
 Syke Bornetto – drums
 Harris Johns – producer

References 

1986 albums
Exumer albums
Albums produced by Harris Johns
Disaster Records albums